The Beginner's Goodbye is a 2012 novel by Anne Tyler.

Plot summary
Aaron Woolcott is an editor for a publisher of books with the beginner in mind.  After the death of Aaron's wife, Dorothy, he thinks there should be a beginner's guide to dealing with the death of a spouse.

Reviews
 Michiko Kakutani:"Haunted by Life, Haunted by Wife", New York Times (April 5, 2012).
 Julia Glass: "Grieving Lessons",  New York Times (May 4, 2012).

References

External links

2012 American novels
Alfred A. Knopf books
Novels by Anne Tyler